Three military camps and an officers' school in Bujumbura, the then-capital of Burundi, came under fire on 11 December 2015. Several soldiers were reportedly killed, but the government said that the attacks had failed. Nevertheless, fighting continued well into the day, although it had apparently stopped by 12 December. Army Spokesman Gaspard Baratuza later updated the death toll to say: "The final toll of the attacks yesterday is 79 enemies killed, 45 captured, and 97 weapons seized, and on our side eight soldiers and policemen were killed and 21 wounded." While residents in Bujumbura discovered 39 bodies lying on the streets, Baratuza later said the bodies belonged to "enemies." The death toll also later rose to 87. An unnamed general behind the failed coup attempt said that his rebel group still targeted the removal of the President of Burundi, Pierre Nkurunziza. Other residents posted pictures on social media showing some of the bodies with their hands tied behind their backs, while police spokesman Pierre Nkurikiye said there were "no collateral victims." Baratuza added that those who attempted to raid the Ngagara military camp retreated and were pursued by security forces who "inflicted on them considerable losses." Kenya Airways also cancelled flights to Bujumbura International Airport on 11 December but would resume them on 13 December.Reuters

References

2015 in Burundi
Mass murder in 2015
Terrorist incidents in Africa in 2015